Deltophalonia termasia is a species of moth of the family Tortricidae. It is found in Ecuador in the provinces of Napo and Tungurahua.

The wingspan is about 26 mm. The ground colour of the forewings is brownish grey in the posterior third of the wing with browner suffusions and indistinct fascia. The ground colour is browner in the remaining areas. The hindwings are creamish, densely strigulated (finely streaked) with brownish grey and suffused with the same colour apically.

Etymology
The species name refers to Las Termas, the type locality.

References

Moths described in 2009
Cochylini